Yitzhak Suknik (1920 – 8 May 1943), frequently known as Koza, was a fighter in the Jewish Fighting Organization (Polish:  ŻOB). and a member of Hashomer Hatzair. He played a crucial role in the organisation and building of small arms to be used in the Uprising. He took part in the first action of the Warsaw Ghetto Uprising on January 18, 1943, saving the life of Mordechai Anielewicz. During the Uprising in April he was a member of the fighting unit led by Mordechai Growas in the Central Ghetto, and known as an excellent marksman. He died on 8 May 1943 whilst trying to escape to the Aryan side via the sewers.

Early life
Yitzhak was born in Warsaw, Poland in 1920. His family were middle-class Jews; his parents were Meier Suknik and Cesia (née Lament). They had two other sons Moszek (born 1918) and Srul (born 1926). Both his maternal and paternal families originated from the town of Chmielnik, near Kielce in central Poland.

Suknik studied metalwork at the Vocational School on Stawki Street in Warsaw. He also completed his military service in the Polish army, having achieved the rank of sergeant, and was known as a distinguished marksman. Noted for his good temper and his cheerfulness, his friends nicknamed him Koza (goat), which remained as his nom de guerre when he joined the Jewish Underground Movement.  He was Member no. 13 of the "Ha-Shomer Ha-Tsa'ir". Just before the war when Polish anti-Semitic attacks became more frequent on Warsaw streets he and his friends would go out and protect Jewish pedestrians.

1939-1942
On the 10th September 1939 Suknik's mother and his younger brother Srul were killed during the German attack on Warsaw. Suknik returned to Warsaw, where the city's Jewish population was forced to live in the Ghetto. During 1941 the remaining members of his immediate family died; his grandfather Josef in June, his older brother Moszek in August and finally his father in November; the latter two dying of Typhus.
 

In September 1941, Suknik escaped Warsaw to join a Hashomer Hatzair training farm near Częstochowa. In mid-1942, they disbanded and he returned to Warsaw to take an active part in Hashomer Hatzair. joining the Jewish Combat Organisation.

Small arms manufacture and weapon training

When the Z.O.B was formed in July 1942 they had no arms. By August they received their first shipment of weapons from the Polish side, five pistols and six hand grenades. It did not improve much in the months that followed and more often than not the weapons were in a poor condition and were only partially usable.
On his own initiative, Yitzhak founded a workshop in the ghetto to prepare hand grenades and to repair small weapons. By the end of 1942, he became one of the most important producers of weapons, heading two workshops, whose production reached a significant volume of up to 50 grenades a day. 
He also trained other recruits in the Ghetto in the use of guns, going twice a week to the house of Lotek Rotblat on 44 Muranovska Street to give weapons training.

The First Armed Resistance - 18 January 1943 
At 07.00 hrs Nazi forces under the command of SS Brigadier General Ferdinand von Sammern-Frankenegg moved into the ghetto to round up 8,000 Jews to be sent to Treblinka, with a further 16,000 for labour camps around Lublin.

The Jewish Combat Organisation was able to mobilise five units to the Umschlagplatz. Suknik was in a Hashomer Hatzair unit in the Central Ghetto commanded by Mordechai Anielewicz. They were armed with five revolvers, five grenades, Molotov cocktails, crowbars and clubs.

The fighters joined the line of hundreds of prisoners concentrated on Mila Street. As they reached the corner of Zamenhof and Niska, they attacked, each member of the unit targeting a German soldier. Towards the end Anielewicz, surrounded by several gendarmes, was saved by Suknik throwing two grenades at the SS officers who were pursuing him, one grenade killing two Germans whilst the others ran away, allowing Anielewicz to escape.

"The Jewish Fighting Organization led the January self-defense action. Key commanders and fighters there included Mordekhai Anielewicz, Zekariah Artszteyn, Margalit Landau, Benjamin Leibgot, Abraham Feiner and Yitzhak Sukenik."

The Warsaw Ghetto Uprising – April 1943
The Jewish Combat Organisation (ZOB) organised into three distinct areas: the Central Ghetto, the Brushmakers Workshop area and the Toebbens-Schultz Workshop area. Suknik fought in a combat unit commanded by Mordechai Growas in the Central Ghetto.

On 21 April the ZOB's HQ at Mila 29 caught fire and had to be evacuated. Anielewicz led a group of around twenty fighters towards Nalewki street but decided to spend the night at Mila 17 where they were joined by other fighters. Suknik was part of this ZOB group at Mila 17.  On the 22 April the Germans were positioned in Kupiecka Street, parallel to Mila, while the fighters positioned themselves in a large yard and prepared to ambush the Nazis. He was posted just in front of the gate to the yard and shot two of the Germans dead with one bullet.

The Warsaw Ghetto Uprising – May 1943 
Tuvia Borzykowski describes an ambush of the Nazis that took place on May 1, which unusually took place during the day rather than at night. "When the right moment came we attacked. Yitzhak Suknik (Koza), a member of Hashomer Hatzair sent a burst of fire at the Germans, felling three of them."
This is corroborated in Out of the Flames by Chaim Primer:

Escape And Death: 7–8 May 1943 
At this point Suknik was now at the new ZOB's HQ at Mila 18 where Mordechai Anielewicz had begun preparation for fighters to attempt escape through the sewers to the so-called Aryan side.

Suknik was part of a group of eleven trying to reach the Aryan side. Their guide was supposed to take them to Bielanska St. but the sewer system was a hazardous maze and they ended up at Dluga St. As it was on the Aryan side they decided to leave the sewers. Just before dawn on 8 May as they were exiting the sewer, they were spotted by Polish police. There was an attempt to bribe the policemen but German troops nearby heard the commotion and came over. Hela Schupper's recounts, "I heard gunshots. Koza, who was probably one of the best shooters in the ZOB, ran towards the German to shoot him with his gun. As he was shooting, the others dispersed. I ran as well." Helena evaded capture. Yitzhak Suknik was shot dead.

References

Further reading
 Brave and Desperate: Beit Lohamei Haghetaot ISBN 965-7240-02-6.
 The Ghetto Men. French L. MacLean. Schiffer Publishing. ISBN 0-7643-1285-5.
 Flags over the Warsaw Ghetto. Moshe Arens. Gefen Publishing House. ISBN 9789652295279.
 Resistance, The Warsaw Ghetto Uprising. Israel Gutman. Houghton Miffin Company. ISBN 0-395-90130-8.
 The Bravest Battle. Dan Kurzman.  DA CAPO Press. ISBN 0-306-80533-2.
 Resistance. Jews and Christians who defied the Nazi Terror. Nechama Tec. Oxford University Press. ISBN 978-0-19-973541-9.

External links
Yad Vashem - List of Jewish Resistance fighters who died in battle during the Warsaw Ghetto Uprising in 1943
Polish Centre for Holocaust Research
Warsaw Ghetto Museum -  People of the Ghetto

1920 births
1943 deaths
Jewish Combat Organization members
Jewish resistance members during the Holocaust
Military personnel from Warsaw